The Via Labicana Augustus is a sculpture of the Roman emperor Augustus as Pontifex Maximus, with his head veiled for a sacrifice. The statue is dated as having been made after 12 BCE. It was found on slopes of the Oppian Hill, in the Via Labicana, in 1910.  It is now in the Palazzo Massimo alle Terme at the National Museum of Rome. Augustus became the Pontifex Maximus when Lepidus, the previous Pontifex Maximus, died in late 13 or early 12 BCE.

The statue adds another aspect to Augustus' self-representation; not only is he the political head of the Roman Empire, he is also the religious head of it. In the Res Gestae 19-21 he talks about all of his religious benefactions to the city of Rome, such as building temples for "Minerva, Queen Juno and Jupiter Libertas."

Augustan representations in statue form are highly controlled to the extent that there are only three or four different subgroups; based on features such as the detail of the hairstyle this may be classified as one of the "Prima Porta type". This depiction of Augustus is similar to a depiction of him in relief on the exterior of the Ara Pacis Augustae. As with all of Augustus' statues he is depicted in an idealizing Greek style and as much younger than his actual age at the time, as opposed to the traditional Republican Roman portraiture, which is realist in its approach.

References

External links
Matthew Brennan: 3D Restoration of the arms (Sketchfab)

Collections of the National Roman Museum
Augustus in Ancient Roman sculpture
Marble sculptures in Italy
Archaeological discoveries in Italy
1910 archaeological discoveries